Chen Yan (born March 27, 1981 in Dalian, Liaoning) is a retired Chinese swimmer. She won Gold medal at 4×200m freestyle at 1997 FINA Short Course World Championships. Later that year at Chinese National Games, she broke world record at 400m individual medley. She then won 400m individual medley and 400m freestyle at 1998 Perth World Aquatics Championships. She participated in 1996 and 2000 two Olympic Games but did not medal. Not to be confused with Chen Yan (swimmer, born 1979), she has never tested positive in any drug test.

She started college in China and transferred to UH Manoa in 2002 as a sophomore. She earned her BS in 3 years, and swam on an Athlete Full Scholarship. She has recently completed a master's degree at UH and has been working in recreation management. She was the head coach for Punahou Aquatics in Honolulu, HI.  She resigned on May 20, 2016 and is now a real-estate broker for Aloha Properties.

Personal Bests 
In long course
 400m medley: 4:34.79 World Record (October 13, 1997)
 400m freestyle: 4:05.00 Asian Record (October 17, 1997)
 800m freestyle: 8:27.94 Asian Record (October 20, 1997)

References 

1981 births
Living people
Swimmers from Dalian
Chinese female medley swimmers
Olympic swimmers of China
Swimmers at the 1996 Summer Olympics
Swimmers at the 2000 Summer Olympics
World record setters in swimming
Chinese female freestyle swimmers
World Aquatics Championships medalists in swimming
Medalists at the FINA World Swimming Championships (25 m)
Asian Games medalists in swimming
Asian Games silver medalists for China
Asian Games bronze medalists for China
Swimmers at the 1998 Asian Games
Medalists at the 1998 Asian Games